Rodica is a settlement on the outskirts of Domžale in the Upper Carniola region of Slovenia. It includes the hamlet of Groblje.

Name
Rodica was attested in historical sources as Rodiza in 1232, Radicz in 1426, Rodiczs in 1428, and Rodin in 1467, among other spellings.

Church
The local parish church is built in the hamlet of Groblje in the settlement and is dedicated to Saints Hermagoras and Fortunatus. It was first mentioned in documents dating to 1526. In the late 18th century the church became the Carniolan centre of worship of Saint Notburga, a patron saint of peasants. At this time the original late Gothic church was rebuilt in the Baroque style and its interior fully painted with frescos by the painter Franc Jelovšek. Between 1998 and 2002 all five altars and the pulpit were restored, and in 2006 a new organ was built in the church.

Notable people
Notable people that were born or lived in Rodica include:
 Alojzij (Lojze) Mav (1898–1977), composer
 Franc Rode (born 1934), cardinal
 Anton Šubelj (1899–1965), singer and musician
 Alenka Gotar (born 1977), soprano, represented Slovenia in the 2007 Eurovision Song Contest

References

External links

Rodica on Geopedia

Populated places in the Municipality of Domžale